Jaroslav Šaršok (born May 17, 1990) is a Czech professional ice hockey forward. He played 7 games for Lev Poprad of the Kontinental Hockey League (KHL) during the 2011-12 season.

References

External links 
 

1990 births
Living people
Czech ice hockey forwards
HSC Csíkszereda players
SHK Hodonín players
Hull Pirates players
HC Lev Poprad players
People from Prachatice
IHC Písek players
HC Prešov players
TKH Toruń players
Sportspeople from the South Bohemian Region
Czech expatriate ice hockey players in Slovakia
Czech expatriate sportspeople in Romania
Expatriate ice hockey players in Romania
Czech expatriate sportspeople in Poland